Darren Arbet (born November 26, 1962) is a former Arena Football League head coach for the San Jose SaberCats and current general manager and head coach of the Bay Area Panthers of the Indoor Football League. He has a career record of 169-73, including four titles, ArenaBowl XVI, ArenaBowl XVIII, ArenaBowl XXI, and ArenaBowl XXVIII.

Early life
Arbet attended Edison High School in Stockton, California, where he was a standout in football and track & field.

College career
Arbet played four seasons for the Sacramento State Hornets football team from 1981 to 1985 as a defensive end.

Professional career

Los Angeles Cobras
Arbet joined the Los Angeles Cobras in 1988.

Maryland Commandos
Arbet played for the Maryland Commandos in 1989.

Coaching career

Sacramento State
Arbet coached tight ends at his alma mater in 1990.

Albany Firebirds
Arbet received a job coaching fullbacks and linebackers for the Albany Firebirds in 1992. When defensive coordinator Doug Kay, received the offer to coach the Charlotte Rage in 1995, Arbet was promoted to defensive coordinator by the Firebirds.

San Jose SaberCats
On January 13, 1999, the San Jose SaberCats named Arbet their second head coach in franchise history. He won four ArenaBowls with the SaberCats. He also served as general manager, and later bought a stake in the team. His tenure ended when the SaberCats pulled out of the AFL shortly after winning their fourth ArenaBowl.

Humboldt State University
Arbet became the Assistant Head Coach, Linebackers Coach, and Special Teams Coordinator for the Humboldt State Lumberjacks in 2016.

Cabrillo Junior College
Head Coach 2017–2020 fired

Bay Area Panthers
General Manager and Head Coach 2022–present

AFL head coaching record

Personal life
In 2002, Arbet became the first African-American head coach to win a pro-football championship when he coached the SaberCats to a victory at ArenaBowl XVI. His nephew is former AFL player Kevin Arbet.

References

External links
 Darren Arbet (coach) at ArenaFan Online
 Darren Arbet (player) at ArenaFan Online

1967 births
Living people
American football linebackers
Cabrillo Seahawks football coaches
Humboldt State Lumberjacks football coaches
Indiana Firebirds coaches
Los Angeles Cobras players
Maryland Commandos players
Sacramento State Hornets football players
San Jose SaberCats coaches
Players of American football from Stockton, California
African-American coaches of American football
African-American players of American football
21st-century African-American people
20th-century African-American sportspeople